Atsonupuri (Ainu: アトゥサヌプリ, Atusa-nupuri; , Atosa-dake) is a stratovolcano located in the central part of Iturup Island, Kuril Islands, Russia.

References 

Iturup
Stratovolcanoes of Russia
Active volcanoes
Volcanoes of the Kuril Islands
Mountains of the Kuril Islands
Holocene stratovolcanoes